Olearia gardneri, commonly known as Gardner's tree daisy, is a species of flowering plant in the family Asteraceae.
It is found only in New Zealand. At one point it was ranked as New Zealand's rarest tree, with only 160 wild individuals known.

References

External links 
 Olearia gardneri discussed in RNZ Critter of the Week, 26 July 2019

gardneri
Flora of New Zealand